Ë, ë (e-diaeresis) is a letter in the Albanian, Kashubian, Emilian-Romagnol, Ladin, and Lenape alphabets. As a variant of the letter e, it also appears in Acehnese, Afrikaans, Breton, Dutch, English, Filipino, French, Luxembourgish, Piedmontese, Russian, the Abruzzese dialect of the Neapolitan language, and the Ascolano dialect. The letter is also used in Seneca, Taiwanese Hokkien, Turoyo, and Uyghur when written in Latin script.

Usage in various languages

Acehnese
In Acehnese, ë is used to represent  (schwa), a mid central vowel.

Afrikaans
In Afrikaans, the trema (Afrikaans: deelteken) is used mostly to indicate that the vowel should not be diphthongised: geër ("giver") is pronounced , and geer (a wedge-shaped piece of fabric) is pronounced .

Sometimes, however, the deelteken does not change the pronunciation. For example, in reën ("rain"), which is pronounced . The nonexistent word *reen would have been pronounced identically, and the deelteken is only etymological since the archaic form of reën is regen. The deelteken indicates the removal of g, and some older people still pronounce reën in two syllables.

The deelteken does exactly what it means in Afrikaans ("separation mark") by marking the beginning of a new syllable and by separating it from the previous one. For example, voël ("bird") is pronounced in two syllables. Without the deelteken, the word would become voel ("feel"), which is pronounced in one syllable.

Albanian
Ë is the 8th letter of the Albanian alphabet and represents the vowel . It is the fourth most commonly used letter of the language, comprising 7.74 percent of all writings.

Armenian
Ë is used in the romanization of Classical or Eastern Armenian to represent the letter  (ët’).

Ascolano
Ë is a phonetic symbol also used in the transcription of Abruzzese dialects and in the Province of Ascoli Piceno (the Ascolano dialect). It is called "mute E" and sounds like a hummed é. It is important for the prosody of the dialect itself.

Dutch
In Dutch, ë appears in the plural form of most words that end in -ie or -ee, like kolonie -> koloniën, zee -> zeeën, and knie -> knieën (Dutch-language rules stipulate an extra e before the ë in plurals if the accent falls on the syllable containing the ë). This so-called trema indicates that the vowel should not be monophthongized. For example, koloniën is pronounced , but kolonien would be pronounced .

Emilian-Romagnol 
Ë is used in Romagnol to represent [ɛː~ɛə], e.g. fradël [fraˈdɛəl~fraˈdɛːl] "brother". In some peripheral Emilian dialects, ë is used to represent [ə], e.g. strëtt [strətː] "narrow".

English
Use of the character Ë in the English language is relatively rare. Some publications, such as the American magazine The New Yorker, use it more often than others. It is used to indicate that the e is to be pronounced separately from the preceding vowel (e.g. in the word "reëntry", the feminine name "Chloë" or in the masculine name "Raphaël"), or at all - like in the name of the Brontë sisters, where without diaeresis the final e would be mute.

Filipino
Ë represents the schwa sound in loanwords from Maranao, Pangasinan, Ilocano, and other Cordillera languages in the Philippines.

Finnic
Ë is used in the orthography of Proto-Finnic to denote an unrounded (mid?) back vowel [ɤ~ɤ̞~ʌ] the back counterpart to [e] for Proto-Finnic's system of vowel harmony. It is also used in the allophonic diphthong [ɤu] - ëu.

French
Ë appears in words like French Noël. Like in Dutch, it is used to indicate that the vowel should not be monophthonged. For example, Noël is pronounced , whilst Noel would be pronounced .

German

Ë does not occur in the official German alphabet. However, a diaeresis above e in German occurs in a few proper names and ethnonyms, such as Ferdinand Piëch, Bernhard Hoëcker, Alëuten, Niuë. Occasionally, a diaeresis may be used in some well-known names, such as Italiën, which is usually written as Italien. Without a diaeresis, ie would be [iː] instead of [iə]; eu would be [ɔʏ] instead of [eu] and ae, oe, ue would be alternative representations of respectively ä, ö, ü.

Hungarian
Ë does not belong to the official Hungarian alphabet, but is usually applied in folklore notations and sometimes also in stylistic writing, e.g. is extensively used in the vocal oeuvre of Kodály. The reason is that open e (close to English hat, cat, cap) and closed ë (close to Spanish e) are distinguished in most spoken dialects, but is not indicated in writing because of the history of writing and due to little but observable areal variation.

Kashubian
Ë is the 9th letter of the Kashubian alphabet and represents .

Ladin
Although not used in standard Ladin, Ë is used in the local variations gherdëina, badiot and fodom. It represents .

Latin
In many editions of Latin texts, the diaeresis is used to indicate that ae and oe form a hiatus, not a diphthong (in the Classical pronunciation) or a monophthong (in traditional English pronunciations). Examples: aër "air", poëta "poet", coërcere "to coerce".

Lenape
In the Lenape language, the letter ë is used to represent the schwa vowel. An example of its use is the word mikwën, which means "feather". It can also be found in more complex words, such as ntëmpëm, which means "my brain".

Luxembourgish
In Luxembourgish,  is used for stressed schwa  like in the word ëmmer ("always"). It is also used to indicate a morphological plural ending after two  such as in Eeër ("eggs") or leeën ("lay").

Mayan languages
In the modern orthography of Mayan languages, the letter Ë represents .

Piedmontese
Ë represents the mid central vowel  in the modern orthography of Piedmontese language.

Quenya
In constructed language Quenya diaeresis indicates that a vowel is not part of a diphthong, for example in ëa or ëo, while final ë is marked with a diaeresis to remind English-speakers that it is not silent.

Russian
Other translations use yo, jo or (ambiguously) simply e.

Syriac
In the romanization of Syriac, the letter Ë gives a schwa. In some grammatical constructions, it is a replacement for the other, original vowels (a, o, e, i, u). Example words that have Ë: knoṭër ("he is waiting"), krëhṭi ("they are running"), krëqdo ("she is dancing"), ŝërla ("she has closed"), gfolëḥ ("he will work"), madënḥo ("east"), mën ("what"), ašër ("believe"). Turoyo and Assyrian languages may utilize this diacritic, albeit rarely.

Seneca
In Seneca, the letter Ë is used to represent , a close-mid front unrounded nasalized vowel.

Tagalog
In Tagalog and its standardized form Filipino, Ë is used to represent the schwa, particularly in words originating from other Philippine languages, for instance Maranao (Mëranaw), Pangasinan, Ilocano, and Ibaloi. Before introduction of this letter, schwa was ambiguously represented by A or E.

Uyghur
Ë is the 6th letter of the Uyghur Latin alphabet and represents close-mid front unrounded vowel .

Character mappings

See also
Umlaut (diacritic)
Yo, a Cyrillic homoglyph

References 

E-umlaut